Pitpilot is the first magazine solely devoted to the UK surfing scene. The magazine was first published on 12 December 2003.  Joe Moran is the founder of the magazine.

Pitpilot is published on a bimonthly basis in Newquay, Cornwall. The owner is Arcwind Ltd, based in Woodstock, Oxfordshire. In 2009 Tony Plant was appointed editor of the magazine.

References

External links
Pitpilot website

2003 establishments in the United Kingdom
Bi-monthly magazines published in the United Kingdom
Sports magazines published in the United Kingdom
Magazines established in 2003
Mass media in Cornwall
Surfing magazines
Surfing in the United Kingdom